The Rt Hon. Sir James Johnston, PC (29 November 1849 – 13 April 1924) was a unionist politician in Northern Ireland.

Johnston was a company director and was elected to the Belfast Corporation for the Irish Unionist Party.  He was High Sheriff of Belfast in 1912/3, and Lord Mayor of Belfast from 1917 to 1919.  In 1921, he was elected to the Senate of Northern Ireland, but served only three years.  He was a Deputy Speaker of the Senate from 1921 until 1923.

References

External links
 

1849 births
1924 deaths
High Sheriffs of Belfast
Lord Mayors of Belfast
Members of the Senate of Northern Ireland 1921–1925
Ulster Unionist Party members of the Senate of Northern Ireland
Members of the Privy Council of Ireland
Knights Bachelor